Abide with Me is a 1935 play by American playwright Clare Boothe Luce.

External links
 

Plays by Clare Boothe Luce
1935 plays